A Gutter Magdalene is a lost 1916 American drama silent film directed by George Melford and written by Clinton Stagg. The film stars Fannie Ward, Jack Dean, Charles West, William Elmer, Gertrude Kellar and Ronald Bradbury. The film was released on June 4, 1916, by Paramount Pictures.

Plot
Maida Carrington (Fannie Ward) goes to a city with a gambler (Charles West) but runs away after she witnesses the gambler steal money from Steve Boyce (Jack Dean). The woman takes a job with the Salvation Army and after that she meets Steve again because he now has no money and needs help. They fall in love and Steve asks her to marry him, but Maida thinks she isn't a good match for him because of her past association with the gambler. She goes and finds the gambler and tries to get him to return the money to Steve. He refuses and they struggle, and Maida accidentally shoots him with his own gun. The sheriff knows about the gambler and clears her of the murder charge. After that, the woman returns the money to Steve and agrees to marry him.

Cast 
Fannie Ward as Maida Carrington
Jack Dean as Steve Boyce
Charles West as Jack Morgan
William Elmer as Halpin 
Gertrude Kellar as Helen
Ronald Bradbury as Sheriff Barrett 
James Neill as Goodwin

References

External links 
 
 

1916 films
1910s English-language films
Silent American drama films
1916 drama films
Paramount Pictures films
Films directed by George Melford
American black-and-white films
Lost American films
American silent feature films
1916 lost films
Lost drama films
1910s American films